Sonny Spencer (18 May 1903 – 21 November 1943) was a British middle-distance runner. He competed in the men's 1500 metres at the 1924 Summer Olympics. He was killed in action during World War II.

Personal life
Spencer served as a sergeant in the Royal Air Force Volunteer Reserve during the Second World War. He was killed in a night training accident when his Short Sunderland crashed at Nigg on 21 November 1943. Spencer is commemorated at the Runnymede Memorial.

References

External links
 

1903 births
1943 deaths
Athletes (track and field) at the 1924 Summer Olympics
British male middle-distance runners
Olympic athletes of Great Britain
Place of birth missing
Royal Air Force personnel killed in World War II
Royal Air Force Volunteer Reserve personnel of World War II
Royal Air Force airmen
Victims of aviation accidents or incidents in 1943
Victims of aviation accidents or incidents in Scotland
People from Mitcham
Athletes from London
Military personnel from London